Tonny Jensen (born 9 April 1941) is a Danish equestrian. He competed in the individual dressage event at the 1976 Summer Olympics.

References

External links
 

1941 births
Living people
Danish male equestrians
Danish dressage riders
Olympic equestrians of Denmark
Equestrians at the 1976 Summer Olympics
People from Møn
Sportspeople from Region Zealand